Jimmy Lyons (December 1, 1931 – May 19, 1986) was an American alto saxophone player. He is best known for his long tenure in the Cecil Taylor Unit. Lyons was the only constant member of the band from the mid-1960s until his death. Taylor never worked with another musician as frequently as he did with Lyons. Lyons' playing, influenced by Charlie Parker, kept Taylor's avant-garde music tethered to the jazz tradition.

Biography
Lyons was born in Jersey City, New Jersey, United States, and raised there until the age of nine, when his mother moved the family to Harlem and then the Bronx. He obtained his first saxophone in the mid-1940s and took lessons from Buster Bailey.

After high school, Lyons was drafted into the United States Army and spent 21 months on infantry duty in Korea. He then spent a year playing in army bands. Once discharged he attended New York University. By the end of the 1950s, Lyons was supporting his interest in music by working for the United States Postal Service.

In 1960, Lyons followed Archie Shepp into the saxophone role in the Cecil Taylor Unit. His post-Parker sound and strong melodic sense became a defining part of the sound of that group, from the 1962 Cafe Montmartre sessions onwards.

During the 1970s, Lyons also ran his own ensemble, with bassoonist Karen Borca and percussionist Paul Murphy. They often performed in the loft jazz movement around Studio Rivbea. Lyons' group and Cecil Taylor Unit continued a parallel development throughout the 1970s and 1980s, often involving the same musicians, including trumpeter Raphe Malik, bassist William Parker and percussionist Murphy.

In 1976, Lyons performed in a production of Adrienne Kennedy's A Rat's Mass directed by Cecil Taylor at La MaMa Experimental Theatre Club in the East Village of Manhattan. Musicians Rashid Bakr, Andy Bey, Karen Borca, David S. Ware, and Raphe Malik also performed in the production. Taylor's production combined the original script with a chorus of orchestrated voices used as instruments.

Lyons died from lung cancer in 1986 at the age of 54. He did not publish many recordings with his own ensemble, though Ayler Records did release a five-CD box set of recordings from 1972 to 1985.

Discography

As leader 
 1969: Other Afternoons with Lester Bowie, Andrew Cyrille, Alan Silva (BYG Records, 1970)
 1978: Push Pull (Hathut Records, 1979) – live
 1980: Riffs with Karen Borca, Jay Oliver, Paul Murphy (hat MUSICS, 1982) – live
 1980: Jump Up / What to Do About with John Lindberg, Sunny Murray (Hathut Records, 1981) – live
 1981: Something in Return with Andrew Cyrille  (Black Saint Records, 1988) – live
 1982: Burnt Offering with Andrew Cyrille (Black Saint Records, 1982) – live
 1983: Wee Sneezawee with Karen Borca, Raphe Malik, Paul Murphy, William Parker (Black Saint Records, 1983)
 1985: Give It Up with Karen Borca, Paul Murphy, Jay Oliver, Enrico Rava (Black Saint Records, 1985)

compilations
 The Box Set (Ayler Records, 2003)[5CD] – previously-unreleased live tracks, limited edition
  The Complete Remastered Recordings on Black Saint & Soul Note (Black Saint Records, 2014)[5CD]

As sideman 

With Cecil Taylor
 Nefertiti, the Beautiful One Has Come (Revenant, 1963) – live
 Unit Structures (Blue Note, 1966)
 Conquistador! (Blue Note, 1968) – recorded in 1966
 Student Studies (BYG, 1973) – live recorded in 1966
 Akisakila (Trio, 1973) – live
 Spring of Two Blue J's (Unit Core, 1974) – live recorded in 1973
 Dark to Themselves (Inner City/Enja, 1977) – live recorded in 1976
 The Great Concert of Cecil Taylor (Prestige, 1977) – live recorded in 1969
 Cecil Taylor Unit (New World, 1978)
 3 Phasis (New World, 1978)
 Live in the Black Forest (MPS, 1978)
 One Too Many Salty Swift and Not Goodbye (Hat Hut, 1980)
 It Is in the Brewing Luminous (Hat Hut, 1981)
 The Eighth (Hat Hut, 1986)
 Winged Serpent (Soul Note, 1985)
 Mixed (Impulse!, 1998)
 The Complete, Legendary, Live Return Concert (Oblivion, 2022)

With Jazz Composer's Orchestra
 Communication (JCOA, 1965) – live
 Escalator over the Hill (JCOA, 1971) – recorded in 1968-71

With Joel Futterman
 In-Between Position(s) (L+R, 1982)
 Moments (Ear Rational, 1983)
 Inneraction (JDF Music, 1984)
 Inner Conversations (Ear-Rational, 1988)
 Passage (Ear-Rational, 1991)

With Paul Murphy
 Cloudburst: Paul Murphy at RCA (Murphy, 1983)
 Red Snapper: Paul Murphy at CBS (CIMP, 2003) – recorded in 1982

With others
 Andrew Cyrille, Nuba (Black Saint, 1979)
 Eddie Gale, Black Rhythm Happening (Blue Note, 1969)
 Gil Evans, Into the Hot (Impulse!, 1962) – recorded in 1961

References

External links
"The Emergence of Jimmy Lyons" by Robert Levin, 1970
Lyons' page on La MaMa Archives Digital Collections

1931 births
1986 deaths
American jazz alto saxophonists
American male saxophonists
Jazz alto saxophonists
Deaths from lung cancer
Musicians from New Jersey
Free jazz saxophonists
BYG Actuel artists
20th-century American saxophonists
20th-century American male musicians
American male jazz musicians